The Masked Singer Turkey is a Turkish reality singing competition television series based on the Masked Singer franchise which originated from the South Korean version of the show King of Mask Singer, premiered FOX on January 1, 2022, produced by MedYapım, presented by Tansel Öngel, jury Eda Ece, Melis Sezen, Alican Yücesoy and Doğu Demirkol. The show ended after one season following rumors about cancellation.

Format
Famous celebrities with different costumes and masks, fight to keep their identities a secret on-and-off the stage. They sing with their own voices while competing with each other in the form of duo or trio duels. The audience and the jury try to guess who the competitor is, with clue packages given in prepared videos prepared as well asking questions to the masks. The contestant who gets the least votes from the audience with his performance at the end of their match gets sent to risk. Finally, the contestant who gets the fewest votes among the masks at risk is eliminated from the contest and must remove his or her mask.

Contestants

Episodes

Episode 1 (1 January)

Episode 2 (2 January)

Episode 3 (8 January)

Episode 4 (9 January)

Episode 5 (15 January)

Episode 6 (22 January)

Episode 7 (29 January)

Episode 8 (5 February)

Episode 9 (12 February)

Notes

References

External links
 

2022 Turkish television series debuts
Turkish television shows